George Alonzo Johnson (1824–1903) 49er, entrepreneur, and California politician.

Johnson was born on August 16, 1824, in Palatine Bridge, New York.  In 1849 as a sailor he heard of the discovery of gold and left New York drawn by the California Gold Rush and came to San Francisco, in June 1849.  There he worked unloading ships, except for a short trip to the mines, until May 1850.  Hearing news of the Glanton Massacre he got together a small group of partners, (including Benjamin M. Hartshorne) with things necessary to build a ferry and traveled to the Yuma Crossing via San Diego. There they built and began operating a ferry, then sold it and returned to San Francisco.

Seeing the opportunity in bringing supplies to the isolated post of Fort Yuma, in 1852 Johnson and his partner Benjamin M. Hartshorne contracted to carry supplies up the Colorado in poled barges. This failed due to the strong current and many sandbars in the river.  After a steam tug, the 20 hp Uncle Sam was successfully used to ascend the river in 1853, Johnson formed George A. Johnson & Company with Hartshorne and another partner Captain Alfred H. Wilcox.  They brought the disassembled side-wheel steamboat General Jesup to the Colorado River Delta.  There in the estuary he assembled this more powerful 70 hp steamboat and began successfully shipping cargo and carrying passengers on the Colorado River from its mouth, up to Fort Yuma.  His steamboat carried 50 tons of cargo to the fort in 5 days and brought the cost to supply the fort down to $75 a ton from the $500 a ton shipped across the desert from San Diego.  It made the Company $4,000 per trip to ships in the mouth of the Colorado River.

Johnson was instrumental in getting Congressional funding for a military expedition to explore the Colorado River above Fort Yuma in 1856.  Cut out of providing the steamboat for the 1857 expedition of Lt. Ives, Johnson at his own expense took the General Jesup up river first exploring the river up to what is now Nevada.

As the only steamboat company on the river, Johnson and his partners became wealthy after the discovery of gold along the Colorado River in 1858.  In 1858 he moved to San Diego, where he married a famous beauty, Maria Estéfana Alvarado on June 4, 1859, in San Diego, California.  Her parents gave Johnson's wife the Rancho Santa Maria de Los Peñasquitos as a wedding present. Johnson also built a home in Yuma for his wife for when they traveled there, that became the commanding officers quarters of the Yuma Quartermaster Depot in 1864.  The Johnsons had nine children, but only two lived to adulthood.

In 1863, Johnson became a Member of the California State Assembly for the 1st District, and again in 1866–67.  Johnson had delegated operations to his senior steamboat captain Issac Polhamus, and distracted by his rancho and political career did not invest in more shipping to keep up with the growing traffic caused by the 1862 Colorado River gold rush.  By 1864 it had created a large backlog of undelivered freight and caused competition of opposition lines to arrive on the Colorado River.  This finally forced Johnson to expand his fleet of steamboats and to begin to use barges to increase their cargo carrying capacity. Following a price war that lasted until 1866, with the advantage of the contracts to supply the U. S. Army posts and his system of wood-yards, Johnson's company was again the only steamboat company on the river.  In 1869 he incorporated his steamboat company as the Colorado Steam Navigation Company which he and his partners held until they sold its steamboats to the Southern Pacific Railroad in 1877.

Johnson acquired title to the Rancho Los Peñasquitos when the U.S. government granted a patent to the land in 1876.  In 1880, the Johnsons lost their rancho to creditors and within several years moved to a building, now known as the Johnson House, which they owned on the plaza of San Diego where they remained until his death.  He died in 1903 at the age of 79 and was buried in San Diego.

References

External links
  George Alonzo Johnson From Society of California Pioneers. Print from copy neg. loaned by Denis Casebier 1969, Nov. 07, in The Otis Marston Colorado River Collection, Huntington Digital Library.

American businesspeople in shipping
Businesspeople from California
Steamship captains
1824 births
1903 deaths
People of the California Gold Rush
Steamboat transport on the Colorado River
History of the American West
People from Palatine Bridge, New York
People from San Diego
19th-century American businesspeople
People in 19th-century California
Members of the California State Assembly
19th-century American politicians